Diogo Leite de Sousa (born 8 August 1993) is a Portuguese footballer who plays for Valadares Gaia FC as a right back.

Football career
Sousa signed with Oliveirense on loan from Vitória in January 2018. On 25 March 2018, Sousa made his professional debut with Oliveirense in a 2017–18 LigaPro match against Real.

References

External links

1993 births
Living people
Footballers from Lisbon
Portuguese footballers
Association football fullbacks
Ermesinde S.C. players
F.C. Infesta players
Padroense F.C. players
Vitória F.C. players
U.D. Oliveirense players
C.D. Fátima players
Liga Portugal 2 players